The 2021 NCAA Division I women's soccer season was the 40th season of NCAA championship women's college soccer.

Preseason

Coaching changes

New programs 
 On November 27, 2017, it was announced that, in 2020, the Tritons of the University of California, San Diego, located in the San Diego, California district of La Jolla, would begin the transition from Division II to Division I as a member of the Big West Conference. UC San Diego and the Big West canceled fall sports in 2020 and they did not play a make-up season in the spring of 2021.  Therefore, the fall of 2021 was the first season for the Tritons in Division I women's soccer.
 On July 15, 2020, after months of consideration, the NCAA granted the highly unusual request of the University of St. Thomas to move directly from Division III to Division I. The school had already accepted an invitation to join the Summit League, and the Tommies entered Division I and Summit League competition in 2021.

Conference realignment 

In addition to these schools moving divisions, the ASUN Conference and the Western Athletic Conference divided into divisional play for the first time.

Season outlook

Preseason polls

Regular season

Major upsets 
In this list, a "major upset" is defined as a game won by a team ranked 10 or more spots lower or an unranked team that defeats a team ranked No. 15 or higher.

All rankings are from the United Soccer Coaches Poll.

Conference standings

Conference winners and tournaments

Postseason

NCAA Tournament

Final rankings

Award winners

All-America teams

Major player of the year awards 
 Hermann Trophy: Jaelin Howell, Florida State
 TopDrawerSoccer.com National Player of the Year Award: Mikayla Colohan, BYU

Other major awards 
 United Soccer Coaches College Coach of the Year: Jennifer Rockwood
 Bill Jeffrey Award: Lesle Gallimore
 Jerry Yeagley Award:
 Mike Berticelli Award: Deborah Raber
 NCAA Tournament MVP: Offensive: Yujie Zhao Defensive: Cristina Roque

See also 
 College soccer
 List of NCAA Division I women's soccer programs
 2021 in American soccer
 2021 NCAA Division I Women's Soccer Tournament
 2021 NCAA Division I men's soccer season

References 

 
NCAA